Guide Post is a village in South East Northumberland, England, about 17 miles (27 km) north of Newcastle upon Tyne. It lies south of the River Wansbeck along with Stakeford. About halfway between Ashington and Morpeth, it is part of the civil parish of Choppington, and has a population of 9,350.

Guide Post is a mainly residential village. There are two pubs: the Anglers Arms and the Shakespeare Tavern, and a Social Club. It has several shops and three schools.

References

Villages in Northumberland
Choppington